This was the first edition of the tournament.

Saketh Myneni won the title by defeating Aleksandr Nedovyesov 6–3, 6–7(4–7), 6–3 in the final.

Seeds

Draw

Finals

Top half

Bottom half

References
 Main Draw
 Qualifying Draw

Indore Open - Singles
2014 Singles